Scawen is a surname. Notable people with the surname include:

James Scawen (1734–1801), English politician
Robert Scawen (1602–1670), English politician
William Scawen (1600–1689), English politician
Woods-Scawen
Anthony Woods-Scawen DFC (1918–1940)
Patrick Woods-Scawen DFC (1916–1940)